A. K. P. Chinraj is an Indian politician. He was elected to the Lok Sabha, lower house of the Parliament of India from Namakkal, Tamil Nadu in the 2019 Indian general election. He belongs to Kongunadu Makkal Desia Katchi, however contested election in 'Rising Sun' symbol of his alliance DMK.

Education 
He received his bachelor's degree in Chemistry from Jamal Mohamed College in 1987.

2019 Loksabha 
He contested in 2019 Loksabha election from Namakkal constituency and won with margin of 2,65,151 votes against ADMK candidate P. Kaliappan.

References

External links
 Official biographical sketch in Parliament of India website

India MPs 2019–present
Lok Sabha members from Tamil Nadu
Living people
Dravida Munnetra Kazhagam politicians
1965 births